Soubrette: Blossom Dearie Sings Broadway Hit Songs is a 1960 studio album by Blossom Dearie, with an orchestra arranged by Russell Garcia.

This was Dearie's first album recorded with full orchestral arrangements.

Track listing
"Guys and Dolls" (Frank Loesser) – 2:52
"Confession" (Howard Dietz, Arthur Schwartz) – 2:44
"Rhode Island Is Famous for You" (Dietz, Schwartz) – 2:14
"To Keep My Love Alive" (Richard Rodgers, Lorenz Hart) – 3:26
"Too Good for the Average Man" (Rodgers, Hart) – 3:31
"The Gentleman Is a Dope" (Oscar Hammerstein II, Rodgers) – 4:19
"Always True to You in My Fashion" (Cole Porter) – 2:52
"Napoleon" (Harold Arlen, Yip Harburg) – 4:19
"Life Upon the Wicked Stage" (Hammerstein, Jerome Kern) – 2:42
"The Physician" (Porter) – 2:15
"Love Is the Reason" (Dorothy Fields, Schwartz) – 3:37
"Buckle Down, Winsocki" (Ralph Blane, Hugh Martin) – 1:49

Tracks 1, 3, 6, 7, 8, 11 recorded on February 19, 1960.
Tracks 2, 4, 5, 9, 10, 12 recorded February 22, 1960.

Personnel
Blossom Dearie – piano, vocals
Russell Garcia – conductor, arranger
Al Harding – reeds
Paul Harn – flute
Red Mitchell – bass
Mel Lewis – drums
Gus Donahue – copyist
Tracks 1, 3, 6, 7, 8, 11
Jerome Kasper, Charles Gentry and Dave Pell - reeds
Jimmy Rowles - piano 
Larry Bunker - xylophone
Tracks 2, 4, 5, 9, 10, 12
Barney Kessel - guitar 
Victor Feldman - xylophone

References

1960 albums
Blossom Dearie albums
Albums arranged by Russell Garcia (composer)
Verve Records albums
Albums produced by Norman Granz
Albums conducted by Russell Garcia (composer)